Shearwater is an unincorporated Nova Scotia suburban community in the Halifax Regional Municipality between Woodside and Eastern Passage occupied by Shearwater heliport. Shearwater is divided into two sections by Main Road, referred to locally as the Upper and Lower Base but part of the same complex. The Upper Base, on the east side of Main Road, houses the airfield and administrative buildings of 12 Wing Shearwater as well as a skate park, pool, gym, and youth centre. The Lower Base, a thin strip between Main Road and Eastern Passage, holds some maintenance buildings, the Atlantic fleet diving unit, training facilities, and a yacht club. Both Bases contain PMQ military housing.

The Shearwater Flyer Trail also begins here. It is a section of the Trans Canada Trail. It is maintained by Cole Harbour Parks & Trails. It was an abandoned railbed, but once it was decommissioned, it was transformed into a recreational trail. You could access it from Corsair Drive, Hines Road, Caldwell Road and Bissett Road.

Geography

Shearwater Airforce Base 
The Shearwater Airforce base is home to the 12 Wing of the Royal Canadian Airforce. It has a history of supporting naval operations due to its proximity to Halifax Harbour. The base currently operates combat ready CH-148 Cyclones in conjunction with the Royal Canadian Navy. In the Second World War, it served as a home to flying boats which conducted marine operations. Training operations were always a part of the base's history, and a target range in Grand Desert was created to support these operations.

References

Explore HRM

Communities in Halifax, Nova Scotia
Populated coastal places in Canada